Vladislav Nikolayevich Duyun (born 9 May 1977) is a Ukrainian professional footballer. He last played for FC Petrotrest Saint Petersburg. He also holds Russian citizenship. He made his debut in the Russian Premier League in 1996 for FC Spartak Moscow.

Honours
 Russian Premier League champion: 1996.

References

European competition history
 1996–97 UEFA Cup with FC Spartak Moscow: 5 games.
 1997 UEFA Intertoto Cup with FC Lokomotiv Nizhny Novgorod: 4 games, 1 goal.
 1999 UEFA Intertoto Cup with FC Rostselmash Rostov-on-Don: 4 games, 1 goal.
 2000 UEFA Intertoto Cup with FC Rostselmash Rostov-on-Don: 2 games.

1977 births
Living people
Ukrainian footballers
FC Zirka Kropyvnytskyi players
FC Metalist Kharkiv players
FC Spartak Moscow players
FC Lokomotiv Nizhny Novgorod players
FC Rostov players
FC Baltika Kaliningrad players
FC Sokol Saratov players
Russian Premier League players
FC Vityaz Podolsk players
Association football midfielders
FC Petrotrest players